Rafael Antonio Roque (born January 1, 1972 in Cotuí, Dominican Republic) is a former baseball player who pitched for three seasons, from 1998 to 2000, with the Milwaukee Brewers. Roque is currently the pitching coach for the DSL Mets2.

Early career
Roque began his professional baseball career in 1991 when he signed with the New York Mets minor league system.  He did not pitch in the minor leagues until the following season, and spent six seasons in the Mets organization, winning no more than 6 games in a single season.  After becoming a minor league free agent, Roque signed with the Brewers organization for the 1998 season.  In his first year with the Brewers, he combined to win 10 games with the AA El Paso Diablos and the AAA Louisville Redbirds, recording a 5-2 record at Louisville.

Major League career
He was called up to the major leagues late in the 1998 season, and made his debut as a starter on August 1 against the Arizona Diamondbacks, earning a no-decision in his first start.  Over the course of the season, Roque had a 4-2 record with a 4.88 earned run average.  Coincidentally, during his first Major League season, Roque gave up both Mark McGwire and Sammy Sosa's 64th home runs.

Roque was named the Brewers' Opening Day starter for the 1999 season.  He did not earn a win in any of his first 8 starts, and pitched out of the bullpen for much of the remainder of the season.   On July 5, 1999, Roque picked up the one and only save of his MLB career in impressive fashion. Roque pitched the final three innings of a 5-0 Brewers win over the Phillies. He allowed 3 hits and zero runs, striking out four hitters. He saved the game for starting pitcher Jim Abbott. 

Roque spent much of the 2000 season in the minor leagues but did appear in four games with the Brewers over the course of the season. These were his last Major League appearances. His major league career ended with a 5-8 record and a 5.36 ERA.

Roque spent 2001 in the Boston Red Sox organization. He then played for the Tigres de México of the Mexican League in 2002–03. After one last brief comeback in Mexico in 2005, his professional career was over.

Coaching career
Roque was named as the pitching coach for the DSL Mets2 of the New York Mets organization for the 2018 season.

References

External links

1972 births
Living people
Binghamton Mets players
Capital City Bombers players
Dominican Republic baseball coaches
Dominican Republic expatriate baseball players in Mexico
Dominican Republic expatriate baseball players in the United States
Dominican Republic national baseball team people
El Paso Diablos players
Gulf Coast Mets players
Indianapolis Indians players
Kingsport Mets players

Louisville Redbirds players
Louisville RiverBats players
Major League Baseball pitchers
Major League Baseball players from the Dominican Republic
Mexican League baseball pitchers
Milwaukee Brewers players
Minor league baseball coaches
Pawtucket Red Sox players
People from Cotuí
Pericos de Puebla players
St. Lucie Mets players
Sultanes de Monterrey players
Tigres de la Angelopolis players
Tigres del México players